Lawrence Bai Xiaoman (1821–1856; Ecclesiastical Latin: Laurentius Bai Xiaoman) was a Roman Catholic saint  and martyr from China. He was born in Guizhou to a poor family, and became an orphan at a young age. He married in his 30s and had a daughter.

Augustus Chapdelaine, a French missionary went to Guangxi in the 1850s to preach the gospel. At this time, Christian missionaries were  forbidden to enter the interior of China away from the treaty ports. Bai was baptized as a Catholic in 1855 and took the name 'Lawrence'. He became closely attached to Chapdelaine.

He was a Catholic for only a year before he was put to death. A the time, a bitter civil war was being fought in China between the Taiping rebels and the Qing government. The Taipings were Christians who believed that their leader Hong Xiuquan was the brother of Jesus Christ. The rebellion had started in Guangxi and the Qing armies massacred huge numbers of civilians in areas that were associated with the rebellion.

Augustus Chapdelaine was known in Guangxi for carrying out missionary activities in a way that offended traditional Chinese customs and culture, especially concerning ancestor worship. In addition, in order to defame Chapdelaine, locals accused him of having sexual relations with female Christians, a common way of slandering Christians and especially missionaries in that time.

In 1856, Chapdelaine was arrested by Qing authorities and they decided to execute him rather than to deport him to one of the Chinese treaty ports where European missionaries were legally permitted to stay. Bai Xiaoman spoke out against his sentence and was arrested by the Qing authorities. Fifteen others were also arrested in association with this episode, including another saint named Agnes Tsao Kou Ying who was also put to death.

After his arrest, they demanded that Bai Xiaoman renounce his Christianity and he refused and so he was executed along with the others in Xilinxian. He was executed in front of his wife and child, and before being put to death he called for his wife to keep the Ten Commandments and to teach the faith to their child. He was beheaded on 25 February 1856 in Guangxi and his body was dumped in a wooded area for wild animals to eat.

He is listed in the Martyrologium Romanum.

References

http://catholicsaints.info/saint-laurentius-bai-xiaoman/ Saint Laurentius Bai Xiaoman

1821 births
1856 deaths
Chinese Roman Catholic saints
People executed by the Qing dynasty by decapitation
Executed people from Guizhou
Executed Qing dynasty people